John E. Roach was an Irish footballer. His regular position was at full back. He played for Manchester United, FC Sète, and Accrington Stanley.

External links
MUFCInfo.com profile

English footballers
English expatriate footballers
Expatriate footballers in France
Ligue 1 players
Manchester United F.C. players
Accrington Stanley F.C. (1891) players
FC Sète 34 players
Association football fullbacks